Mercy High School may refer to:

Mercy High School (Burlingame, California)
Mercy High School (Red Bluff, California)
Mercy High School (San Francisco), California
Mercy High School (Connecticut), Middletown, Connecticut
Mercy High School (Baltimore, Maryland)
Mercy High School (Farmington Hills, Michigan)
Mercy High School (Omaha, Nebraska)
Bishop McGann-Mercy Diocesan High School, formerly Mercy High School, Riverhead, New York
Mercy Career & Technical High School, Philadelphia, Pennsylvania, a private, Roman Catholic high school

See also
 Mercy Academy, a girls Roman Catholic high school in Louisville, Kentucky
 Mother of Mercy High School (Cincinnati, Ohio)
 Our Lady of Mercy High School (disambiguation)
 Mercy College (disambiguation)
 Our Lady of Mercy College (disambiguation)